Dragoneye or 'DragonEye may refer to:

 The Dragoneye expansion set for Dungeons & Dragons Miniatures Game
 The DragonEye equipment on the ISS for docking of the SpaceX Dragon capsule